Lo! is the third published nonfiction work of the author Charles Fort (first edition 1931). In it he details a wide range of unusual phenomena. In the final chapter of the book he proposes a new cosmology that the earth is stationary in space and surrounded by a solid shell which is "not unthinkably far away".

Overview 

Of Fort's four books, this volume deals most frequently and scathingly with astronomy (continuing from his previous book New Lands). The book also deals extensively with other subjects, including paranormal phenomena (see parapsychology), which were explored in his first book, The Book of the Damned.

In Lo!, Fort coined the now-popular term "teleportation". He also tied his previous statements on what he referred to as the Super-Sargasso Sea into his beliefs on teleportation. He would later expand this theory to include purported mental and psychic phenomena in his fourth and final book, Wild Talents.

It takes its derisive title from what he regarded as the tendency of astronomers to make positivistic, overly precise, and premature announcements of celestial events and discoveries. Fort portrays them as quack prophets, sententiously pointing towards the skies and saying "Lo!".

Lo! has been described as Fort's "most accessible, most readable book". It is divided into two sections: the first on the above phenomena; the second, on his attacks on the contemporary astronomy. The reason for this is that Fort had been working on a follow-up to The Book of the Damned, but he scrapped the idea and incorporated many of the subjects into this one.

Lo! is used extensively in Blue Balliett's book Chasing Vermeer.

Part One: Teleportation

Fort establishes his thesis for this particular book early on—that some sort of mysterious force, known as the "cosmic joker" (sic), is responsible for the teleportation of people, animals, and materials. This thesis would be revised later to accommodate Fort's research on psychic phenomena in Wild Talents.

Fort starts the book largely where he left off in The Book of the Damned: mysterious falls of animals and strange materials, flying stones, poltergeist activity, etc., and incorporates these strange phenomena into his new theory on teleportation, saying that teleportation from the Super-Sargasso Sea can explain these phenomena. He writes a chapter on the winter of 1904–1905 in Britain, when a widespread religious revival in England and Wales coincided with numerous other strange occurrences: the appearances of ghosts, poltergeists, a few purported cases of Spontaneous Human Combustion, and a ravenous predator mutilating sheep and other farm animals in Northumberland.

Fort believed that all of these anomalous phenomena can be explained by his teleportation theory—though he later apparently retracts this theory to an extent in his final book, Wild Talents.

Part Two: Astronomy 

Fort was sceptical of Albert Einstein's theories of relativity and the claim that these could be confirmed by a transit of the Sun. He was sceptical of the accuracy of the mathematics and the observations involved, and pointed out seeming contradictions and anomalies in scientists' statements to the press.

Publication 
Lo! was pubiished in February 1931. It received positive reviews in both the New York Times and the New York Herald Tribune and quickly went into a third printing.

Availability 
The book was re-released in a paperback version in the 1990s, and is also included in The Complete Works Of Charles Fort with Fort's other paranormal writings.

See also
Charles Fort
Tiffany Thayer

External links
Edited and Annotated Online Version
https://web.archive.org/web/20120203115215/http://www.forteans.com/ The homepage of the International Fortean Organization (INFO)

References 

Books by Charles Fort
Pseudoarchaeological texts
1931 non-fiction books